International Business School is an accredited private college in Budapest, Hungary. It was founded in 1991, by Prof. István Tamás.

International Business School Budapest (Hungary) offers degree programmes in partnership with The University of Buckingham (UK) in Budapest and Vienna campuses. 

It was accredited in Hungary, the UK, EU, and the United States. The graduates of this university receive diploma of the University of Buckingham.

Programs

Degree programmes

Undergraduate Degree Programmes 

 BSc in Arts Management
 BSc in Business and Diplomacy
 BSc in Business and Tourism
 BSc in Financial Management
 BSc in Management
 BSc in Management with Psychology

 BSc in Management with Marketing

Postgraduate Degree Programmes 
 MSc in International Management
 MSc in Financial Management
 MSc in Human Resource Management
 MSc in Marketing Management
 MSc in Strategic International Management
 MSc in IT for Business Data Analytics
 Masters by Research programmes
 PhD programmes

Language courses 
  International University Foundation
 Global Gap Year

Notable alumni 
 Rajmund Fodor        – Olympic champion water polo player
 István "Koko" Kovács  – Olympic boxing champion
 Georgina Póta        – European champion table tennis player
 Dániel Varga         – Olympic champion water polo player

References

External links 
 ibs-b.hu – The official website of IBS

Universities in Budapest
Business schools in Hungary
1991 establishments in Hungary